Mohd Sidek bin Hassan (born 24 June 1951) is the Chairman of Petroliam Nasional Berhad (PETRONAS), the national oil and gas corporation of Malaysia, a position he assumed in July 2012.

Prior to joining PETRONAS, Tan Sri served in the Administrative and Diplomatic Service of the Malaysian Civil Service for over 38 years, the last six as the Chief Secretary to the Government of Malaysia.

Career 
Sidek began his career on 15 April 1974 as an Assistant Director at the International Trade Division, Ministry of Trade and Industry. He has extensive working experience within the Ministry of International Trade and Industry (MITI) including postings at MITI offices in Tokyo, (Japan), Sydney, Australia and Washington, D.C. (United States of America). He was appointed as Deputy Secretary-General (Trade) on 19 January 2001 and as the Secretary-General of the Ministry of International Trade and Industry on 24 October 2004.

Sidek served as President of International Islamic University Malaysia (IIUM) between 2008 and 2013, and is currently the Pro-Chancellor of Universiti Teknologi PETRONAS (UTP).

Sidek was a former Board member of Top Glove Corporation Berhad and Malayan Flour Mills Berhad and has been the Chairman of Malaysia Digital Economy Corporation Sdn Bhd (MDEC) since 1 May 2016.

Sidek holds a Bachelor of Economics (Honours) degree in Public Administration from University Malaya and a Master's of Business Administration (MBA) from New Hampshire College, United States of America (now Southern New Hampshire University).

He also holds an Honorary Doctorate degree in Public Administration from Universiti Tun Abdul Razak (UNITAR), an Honorary Doctorate degree in Management from Universiti Putra Malaysia (UPM), an Honorary Doctorate degree in Management from Universiti Teknikal Malaysia Melaka (UTeM) and an Honorary Doctorate degree in International Business from IIUM.

Sidek’s most recent position was at 1MDB where he earned a very high salary but did nothing to stop the country’s worst financial scandals.

Honours

Honours of Malaysia
  :
  Officer of the Order of the Defender of the Realm (KMN) (1994)
  Commander of the Order of Loyalty to the Crown of Malaysia (PSM) – Tan Sri (2006)
  Commander of the Order of the Defender of the Realm (PMN) – Tan Sri (2007)
  :
  Grand Knight of the Order of the Territorial Crown (SUMW) – Datuk Seri Utama (2011)
  :
  Knight Commander of the Order of Loyalty to Sultan Abdul Halim Mu'adzam Shah (DHMS) – Dato' Paduka (2008)
  :
  Knight Grand Commander of the Order of the Life of the Crown of Kelantan (SJMK) – Dato' (2010)
  :
  Grand Commander of the Exalted Order of Malacca (DGSM) – Datuk Seri (2009)
  :
  Knight Companion of the Order of the Crown of Pahang (DIMP) – Dato' (2001)
  Grand Knight of the Order of Sultan Ahmad Shah of Pahang (SSAP) – Dato' Sri (2006)
  :
  Grand Knight of the Order of Cura Si Manja Kini (SPCM) – Dato' Seri (2007)
  :
  Knight Commander of the Most Exalted Order of the Star of Sarawak (PNBS) – Dato Sri (2008)
  :
  Knight Grand Commander of the Order of the Crown of Selangor (SPMS) – Dato' Seri (2011)

References 

1951 births
Living people
Knights Commander of the Most Exalted Order of the Star of Sarawak
People from Pahang
Malaysian people of Malay descent
Malaysian Muslims
Chief Secretaries to the Government of Malaysia
University of Malaya alumni
Southern New Hampshire University alumni
Officers of the Order of the Defender of the Realm
Commanders of the Order of Loyalty to the Crown of Malaysia
Commanders of the Order of the Defender of the Realm
Knights Grand Commander of the Order of the Crown of Selangor